Ikal Angelei is a Kenyan politician and environmentalist. She was born in Kitale. She was awarded the Goldman Environmental Prize in 2012, in particular for her voicing of environmental implications of the Gilgel Gibe III Dam, speaking on behalf of Kenyan indigenous communities. She is the founder of the organisation Friends of Lake Turkana which campaigns for environmental justice in the region around the Lake Turkana.

References 

Living people
Kenyan environmentalists
Kenyan women environmentalists
Year of birth missing (living people)
Goldman Environmental Prize awardees